Dechra Pharmaceuticals plc is a business involved in the development and marketing of veterinary products based in Northwich, England. It is listed on the London Stock Exchange and is a constituent of the FTSE 250 Index.

History
The Company was founded in 1997 by way of a management buy-out from Lloyds Chemists. It was first listed on the London Stock Exchange in 2000. In 2007 it bought VetXX, a Danish veterinary products business, for £62 million. In 2010 it purchased Florida-based DermaPet for US$64 million and Sussex-based Genitrix for £5 million.

It sold its veterinary services business to US-firm, Patterson Companies, for £87.5m in July 2013 in order to focus on its higher margin manufacturing business.

Operations
The Company sells pharmaceuticals - mainly for dogs, cats, equine and food producing animals; products include Vetoryl for Cushing's disease in dogs and Felimazole for hyperthyroidism in cats. It is organised into two divisions: European Pharmaceuticals and US Pharmaceuticals.

See also
 Pharmaceutical industry in the United Kingdom

References

1997 establishments in England
British companies established in 1997
Companies listed on the London Stock Exchange
Companies based in Cheshire
Northwich
Pharmaceutical companies established in 1997
Pharmaceutical companies of England
Veterinary companies of the United Kingdom